Darling, Darling, Darling is a 1982 Indian Tamil-language romantic drama film, written and directed by K. Bhagyaraj. It was released on 14 November 1982. The film was remade in Kannada as Premi No. 1.

Plot
In Ooty, Raja is the son of a watchman in the house of a rich businessman. As a child, Raja and the rich man's daughter Radha are best friends at school. But then, the rich man sends Radha to the US. and she is separated from Raja. Before leaving, Raja promises to Radha he will pay respects to her dead pet dog at the cemetery every day until she returns. 10 years have passed and Raja is unemployed. His sister works at a horse ranch. He still thinks about Radha, seeing their childhood photos all day. One day, Radha returns from US with 4 friends. Raja appears at the train station 2 hours earlier and waits for her arrival. But when she arrives and Raja introduces himself as the watchman's son, Radha asks him to carry their baggage. She forgot about their friendship when they were children. Radha and her friends ask the watchman for a tour guide in Ooty. The watchman assigns Raja to accompany them during their visit. Raja takes the chance.

Raja drives Radha and her friends to the cemetery. Radha's friends think he is a bit weird. Raja introduces Radha to her dog's cemetery and gives her flowers to pay respects. Radha has no memory of the dog and when Raja explains about their childhood promise, Radha advises him to stop the stupid act. Later at home, Raja's sick sister asks him about his love. Raja lies, saying Radha embraced him. The watchman overhears this and is content. The next day, Raja visits Radha and gives her their childhood photos to refresh her memory. Radha acts curious but then she cuts Raja's portions from the photos and keeps only hers. Raja is upset. When Raja returns home, he sees new furniture delivered to his house. His father, the watchman, borrowed loan from a Seth in the excitement about marrying his son to his employer's daughter. Raja drives the girls to a park where a karate trainer is coaching his juniors. The childish girls make noise and irritate the karate trainees to the point where they threaten them to run 8 miles. Raja steps in to help the girls, for the sake of Radha, and challenges to a fight. He defeats all the karate trainees and impresses both the trainer and the girls. Another day, the girls prank on Raja by giving him a fake love letter. Raja writes a heartfelt response about his loyalty to his one and only true love. On hearing this, Radha decides to unite Raja and his true love (oblivious to the truth). When Radha meets Raja's father about this, Raja lets slip the truth: Raja loves Radha and intends to marry her. Radha is startled and tells Raja her groom-to-be (Suman) is arriving the next day. Raja's sister overhears this.

The next day, Suman and his accomplices arrive and stay in Radha's house. Raja watches Suman and confesses to Radha he feels Suman is a more appropriate groom for her. He even starts to address her respectfully, true to his servant status in the house. The watchman, who learns Radha is to be married to Suman and he won't be able to get the rich man's property, is blackmailed by the Seth to repay his loan. Raja drives Suman and Radha to a restaurant. Radha gives Raja money to buy his sister a dress. Raja gives the money to a poor woman and her children, touching Radha's heart in the process. At home, Suman ill-treats Raja due to his servant status and abuses him using his accomplices. Raja is reluctant to retaliate for the sake of Radha. The Seth takes away all the new furniture from Raja's house and warns the watchman to repay the remaining money. In the night, Suman and his friends drink and Suman forces Raja to drink against his wishes. Despite this, Raja later helps Suman who collapses due to excessive alcohol consumption. When Raja tells this to her sister, she gives him an idea to take revenge in a way Radha does not uncover it is him. Raja disguises himself in a superhero costume and crushes Suman's accomplices. The next day, Radha gives Raja's sister money to help her but she refuses, harshly citing her insensitivity and Radha is hurt.

On the way back from a wedding ceremony, the car halts and Raja repairs it under heavy rain. Suman is impatient and temporarily stays at a nearby guesthouse. He takes Radha too. Suman drinks and when Radha changes in the toilet, Suman behaves indecently. Radha is disgusted and returns to the car. Raja is still trying to repair it in the rain. Radha demands Raja to accompany her home. Raja is hesitant but gives in, taking her on a bicycle. En route, Raja and Radha fall from the bicycle. Radha gets injured and her dress is stuck to the bicycle wheel. Contrary to Suman, Raja never sees Radha in an indecent manner and even gives his coat to cover her. He treats Radha, who falls sick due to the rain, at home. Suman sees Radha and Raja's childhood photos and accuses her of infidelity. Radha starts to hate Suman and reunites with Raja, proposing to him too. Seth threatens to torture the watchman when Raja and Radha arrive. Hearing the news about their love, the watchman is assured he will get some of his employer's property. Seth is hopeful, and he requests the watchman for a loan sum when the marriage is over.

But, the rich man's company "Radha's Chit Funds" is a loss and Radha's father is hurt by his employees. Suman's father, who is close to Radha's father, helps him and revives the company. The rich man is indebted to Suman's father and promises to marry Radha and Suman. Radha unwillingly explains her situation to Raja, saying she can't disobey her father and undermine his honor. One night, Suman's father sees Radha weeping and reads her diary, learning about her relationship with Raja. Radha apologizes to him but in a twist, he condemns her for her sin of almost betraying an innocent man who is faithful to her for a decade. Radha and Raja unite at last.

Cast
 K. Bhagyaraj as Raja
 Poornima Bhagyaraj
 Suman
 "Baby" Anju
 Master Suresh
Kallapetti Singaram
V. Gopalakrishnan
Senthamarai
 Mucherla Aruna
 Indhira
 Pandiarajan
 Livingston

Production 
Bhagyaraj differentiated Darling, Darling, Darling from his previous films, which were more on realism and less on the technical aspects, by doing the opposite. After he wrote the script, Poornima was the first actress he thought of when casting the female lead.

Soundtrack
The music was composed by Shankar–Ganesh.

References

External links 
 

1980s Tamil-language films
1982 films
1982 romantic drama films
Films directed by K. Bhagyaraj
Films scored by Shankar–Ganesh
Films shot in Ooty
Indian romantic drama films
Tamil films remade in other languages